Cattleya is a genus of orchids from Costa Rica south to Argentina.  The genus is abbreviated C in trade journals.

Description 
Epiphytic or terrestrial orchids with cylindrical rhizome from which the fleshy noodle-like roots grow. Pseudobulbs can be conical, spindle-shaped or cylindrical; with upright growth; one or two leaves growing from the top of them. The leaves can be oblong, lanceolate or elliptical, somewhat fleshy, with smooth margin. The inflorescence is a terminal raceme with few or several flowers. Flowers have sepals and petals free from each other; the lip or labellum (lowermost petal), usually has a different coloration and shape from the rest of the flower and covers in part the flower column forming a tube. There are four polliniums (bag-like organs that contain pollen). The fruit is a capsule with many small seeds.

Taxonomy
The genus was named in 1824 by John Lindley after horticulturalist William Cattley. Cattley obtained a specimen of then unnamed Cattleya labiata from William Swainson who had discovered the new plant in Pernambuco, Brazil, in 1817. The plant successfully bloomed under the care of Cattley and it became the type specimen from which Lindley described C. labiata.

Currently accepted species and subgeneric division within genus Cattleya are:
Subgenus Cattleya
Section Cattleya
Section Crispae
Series Cattleyodes
Series Hadrolaelia
Series Microlaelia
Series Parviflorae
Series Sophronitis
Section Lawrenceanae
Subgenus Cattleyella
Subgenus Intermediae
Subgenus Maximae

Subgenus Cattleya

Section Cattleya

Section Crispae

Series Cattleyodes

Series Hadrolaelia

Series Microlaelia

Series Parviflorae

Series Sophronitis

Section Lawrenceanae

Subgenus Cattleyella

Subgenus Intermediae

Subgenus Maximae

Natural hybrids 
Currently accepted natural hybrids are:
Cattleya × adrienne (= Cattleya pumila × Cattleya jongheana) (Brazil)
Cattleya × albanensis
Cattleya × amanda
Cattleya × binotii (= ) (Brazil)
Cattleya × brasiliensis (= C. bicolor × C. harrisoniana) (Brazil)
Cattleya × braunae
Cattleya × britoi (= C. crispata x C. mirandae) (Brazil - Minas Gerais)
Cattleya × brymeriana (= C. violacea × C. wallisii) (N. Brazil).
Cattleya × calimaniana (Brazil)
Cattleya × calimaniorum (NE Brazil)
Cattleya × carassana (Brazil)
Cattleya × cattleyioides (Brazil)
Cattleya × cipoensis (Brazil)
Cattleya × colnagiana (Brazil).
Cattleya × cristinae (Brazil).
Cattleya × cypheri
Cattleya × dasilvae
Cattleya × dayana (= C. forbesii × C. guttata) (Brazil).
Cattleya × deckeri
Cattleya × delicata
Cattleya × diamantinensis (= C. pfisteri × C. sincorana) (Brazil).
Cattleya × dolosa (= C. loddigesii × C. walkeriana) (Brazil).
Cattleya × dukeana (= C. bicolor × C. guttata) (SE. Brazil).
Cattleya × duveenii (= C. guttata × C. harrisoniana) (SE. Brazil).
Cattleya × elegans
Cattleya × ericoi
Cattleya × feldmanniana
Cattleya × fidelensis (Brazil - Rio de Janeiro).
Cattleya × frankeana
Cattleya × gaezeriana
Cattleya × gerhard-santosii
Cattleya × gottoana
Cattleya × gransabanensis (=  C. jenmanii × C. lawrenceana) (Venezuela).
Cattleya × gravesiana (=  C. lueddemanniana × C. mossiae) (Venezuela).
Cattleya × hardyana (= C. dowiana var.aurea × C. warscewiczii) (Colombia).
Cattleya × heitoriana
Cattleya × hummeliana
Cattleya × hybrida (= C. guttata × C. loddigesii) (SE. Brazil).
Cattleya × imperator (=  C. granulata × C. labiata) (NE. Brazil).
Cattleya × intricata (= C. intermedia × C. leopoldii) (S. Brazil).
Cattleya × irrorata
Cattleya × isaacii
Cattleya × isabella (= C. forbesii × C. intermedia) (SE. Brazil).
Cattleya × itabapoanaensis
Cattleya × jetibaensis
Cattleya × joaquiniana (= C. bicolor × C. walkeriana) (Brazil) .
Cattleya × kautskyi (= C. harrisoniana × C. warneri) (SE. Brazil).
Cattleya × kerchoveana
Cattleya × labendziana
Cattleya × lambari
Cattleya × lilacina
Cattleya × lucieniana (= C. forbesii × C. granulosa) (SE. Brazil).
Cattleya × macguiganii
Cattleya × measuresii (= C. aclandiae × C. walkeriana) (E. Brazil).
Cattleya × mesquitae (= C. nobilior × C. walkeriana) (Brazil).
Cattleya × mingaensis
Cattleya × mixta (= C. guttata × C. schofieldiana) (Brazil).
Cattleya × moduloi (C. schofieldiana × C. warneri) (Brazil).
Cattleya × mucugensis
Cattleya × neocalimaniana
Cattleya × neocalimaniorum 
Cattleya × neoreginae
Cattleya × nesyana
Cattleya × occhioniana
Cattleya × odiloniana
Cattleya × patrocinii (= C. guttata × C. warneriana) (SE. Brazil).
Cattleya × picturata (= C. guttata × C. intermedia) (SE. Brazil).
Cattleya × pittiana
Cattleya × porphyritis
Cattleya × porphyrophlebia
Cattleya × raganii
Cattleya × resplendens (= C. granulosa × C. schilleriana) (NE. Brazil)
Cattleya × rigbyana
Cattleya × ruschii
Cattleya × sancheziana
Cattleya × schroederiana
Cattleya × schunkiana
Cattleya × schunkii
Cattleya × scita (= C. intermedia × C. tigrina) (S. Brazil).
Cattleya × sgarbii 
Cattleya × sororia
Cattleya × tenuata (= C. elongata × C. tenuis) (Brazil) .
Cattleya × varelae
Cattleya × venosa (= C. forbesii × C. harrisoniana) (Brazil).
Cattleya × verelii
Cattleya × victoria-regina ( C. guttata × C. labiata) (NE. Brazil).
Cattleya × victoriacarolinae
Cattleya × wetmorei
Cattleya × whitei
Cattleya × wilsoniana (= C. bicolor × C. intermedia). (Brazil).
Cattleya × wyattiana (= C. crispa × C. lobata). (Brazil).
Cattleya × zaslawskii (= C. harpophylla × C. praestans). (Brazil).
Cattleya × zayrae (= C. amethystoglossa × C. elongata). (Bahia, Brazil)

Nothogenera 

Hybrids of Cattleya and other genera are placed in the following nothogenera:
 × Brassocattleya = Brassavola × Cattleya
 × Brassolaeliocattleya = Brassavola × Cattleya × Laelia
 × Cattleytonia = Cattleya × Broughtonia
 × Laeliocattleya = Cattleya × Laelia
 × Rhyncholaeliocattleya = Rhyncholaelia × Cattleya

Cultivation 

 Light
Cattleyas need light, but not direct sunlight; in case of intense sunlight, shade must be provided.
 Temperature
Day temperatures must be between 25-30 °C (77-86 °F) and night temperatures not lower than 10-12 °C (50-53.6 °F).
 Humidity
Must be between 40-70% with good ventilation; however plants must not be exposed to air currents.
 Watering
Water only if substrate is dry. It can be done once a week, but it all depends on the environmental conditions and the season.
 Fertilizing
Cattleyas can survive without fertilizing. However, it is advisable to use nitrogen-based fertilizers without urea; fertilizers must be applied during the growth season. To avoid salt accumulation in the substrate, water thoroughly between fertilizer applications.

References

External links 
 
 
  (enter "Cattleya" in search box).
 More info About Orchids Orchids of Costa Rica
 Breeding Cattleya Breeding in Cattleyas
 Painting of a Cattleya by Martin Johnson Heade, 1871 - National Gallery of Art, Washington
 Orchid Picture Gallery
 American Orchid Society - Orchid Web
 Cattleya Orchid Forum
 van den Berg, C. and M.W. Chase. 2000. Nomenclatural notes on Laeliinae - I. Lindleyana 15(2): 115-119.
 Cattleya ochids flowers pictures Photos of Thailand native cattleya orchids
 Orchidroots.org Cattleya Species

 
Laeliinae genera